Cnestis is a genus of flowering plants belonging to the family Connaraceae.

Its native range is Tropical and Southern Africa to Malesia.

Species:

Cnestis bomiensis 
Cnestis corniculata 
Cnestis ferruginea 
Cnestis macrantha 
Cnestis macrophylla 
Cnestis mannii 
Cnestis mildbraedii 
Cnestis palala 
Cnestis polyphylla 
Cnestis racemosa 
Cnestis uncata 
Cnestis urens 
Cnestis yangambiensis

References

Connaraceae
Oxalidales genera